Eurytemora lacustris is a species of crustacean belonging to the family Temoridae.

It is native to Northern Europe.

References

Temoridae